Arthur Township may refer to:

Arthur Township, Michigan
Arthur Township, Kanabec County, Minnesota
Arthur Township, Traverse County, Minnesota
Arthur Township, North Carolina in Pitt County, North Carolina
Arthur Township, Cass County, North Dakota

Township name disambiguation pages